Love, Life & Music is album by the Indonesian diva Rossa. It was released on May 15, 2014, by Trinity Optima Production.

The album received 10× Platinum Awards for the standard version. For the special edition, it received certification by MURI (Museum Record Indonesia) and ASIRI, because it sold over 100,000 copies on the first day of its release.

The album's main single in Indonesia is "Hijrah Cinta (OST. Hijrah Cinta)", and in Malaysia the main single is "'Salahkah (duet with Hafiz Suip) OST. Bukan Kerana Aku Tak Cinta".

The album was nominated in five categories by the World Music Awards (WMA) 2014.

Tracklist 
KFC version
 Jatuh Cinta Setiap Hari
 Sisakan Hatimu
 Kamu Yang Ku Tunggu (feat. Afgan)
 Hijrah Cinta
 Bukan Bukan
 Setia Menanti
 Milyaran Abad
 Hati Tak Bertuan
 Salahkah (feat. Hafiz)
 As One
Oriflame version
 Your Dreams Our Inspirations
 Jatuh Cinta Setiap Hari
 Sisakan Hatimu
 Kamu Yang Ku Tunggu (feat. Afgan)
 Hijrah Cinta
 Bukan Bukan
 Setia Menanti
 Milyaran Abad
 Hati Tak Bertuan
 Salahkah (feat. Hafiz)
 As One

Certifications 

|}

References 

2014 albums
Rossa (singer) albums